The 1971 Polish Speedway season was the 1971 season of motorcycle speedway in Poland.

Individual

Polish Individual Speedway Championship
The 1971 Individual Speedway Polish Championship final was held on 3 October at Rybnik.

Golden Helmet
The 1971 Golden Golden Helmet organised by the Polish Motor Union (PZM) was the 1971 event for the league's leading riders.

Calendar

Final classification
Note: Result from final score was subtracted with two the weakest events.

Junior Championship
 winner - Jerzy Wilim

Silver Helmet
 winner - Zenon Plech & Grzegorz Kuźniar

Team

Team Speedway Polish Championship
The 1971 Team Speedway Polish Championship was the 1971 edition of the Team Polish Championship. 

Polonia Bydgoszcz won the gold medal, which was their first title win since 1955. The team included Henryk Glücklich and Stanisław Kasa.

First League

Second League

References

Poland Individual
Poland Team
Speedway
1971 in Polish speedway